O. africana may refer to:
 Ochrolechia africana, a plant species in the genus Ochrolechia found in Australia
 Olea africana, a synonym for Olea europaea subsp. cuspidata, a plant species

See also
 Africana (disambiguation)